Amy Vermeulen (born November 23, 1983) is a female soccer player who played as a forward, who won the bronze medal with the Canadian women's national soccer team at the 2007 Pan American Games. She played with Vancouver Whitecaps. She played both soccer and ice hockey at Wisconsin.

References

External links
   Profile on Vancouver Whitecaps website 

1983 births
Living people
Canadian people of Dutch descent
Canadian women's soccer players
Canada women's international soccer players
Women's association football forwards
Soccer people from Saskatchewan
University of Wisconsin–Madison alumni
Footballers at the 2007 Pan American Games
Canadian expatriate sportspeople in the United States
Canadian expatriate women's soccer players
People from Rosetown
Vancouver Whitecaps FC (women) players
USL W-League (1995–2015) players
Bälinge IF players
Expatriate women's footballers in Sweden
Expatriate women's soccer players in the United States
Damallsvenskan players
Canadian expatriate sportspeople in Sweden
Expatriate women's footballers in Norway
Canadian expatriate sportspeople in Norway
Pan American Games bronze medalists for Canada
Wisconsin Badgers women's soccer players
Canadian women's ice hockey players
Wisconsin Badgers women's ice hockey players
Pan American Games medalists in football
Medalists at the 2007 Pan American Games
Ottawa Fury (women) players